Daniel Terry Blue Jr. (born April 18, 1949) is an American politician and attorney serving as a member of the North Carolina Senate, representing the state's 14th Senate district, and is the Senate minority leader.

Early life and education 
Blue graduated from North Carolina Central University and the Duke University School of Law, establishing a law practice in Raleigh, North Carolina. He is a member of Alpha Phi Alpha fraternity.

Career

North Carolina Senate

In 2009, Blue was selected by local Democrats to take the place of Sen. Vernon Malone, who died in office. He joined the Senate on May 19, 2009. In 2014, Blue was elected Senate minority leader by his Democratic colleagues when Sen. Martin L. Nesbitt had to step down abruptly due to health issues. Blue was elected to a full term as minority leader after the 2014 elections.

North Carolina House
Blue served in the North Carolina House of Representatives from 1981 through 2002 and from 2006 through his 2009 Senate appointment, representing a portion of the state capital, Raleigh.

Blue was the Speaker of the North Carolina House of Representatives from 1991 until 1994, when the Democrats lost control of the House to Republicans. Blue was the first—and to date, only--African American to hold the post of Speaker in North Carolina.

From 1998 to 1999, Blue served as the first African-American President of the National Conference of State Legislatures.

He sought unsuccessfully to regain his position as Speaker when the Democrats got back the majority in 1999, by forming a coalition of Democrats and Republicans that fell two votes shy of a majority. Blue remained in the House until he ran in the Democratic primary for U.S. Senate in 2002, in which he came in second place behind nominee Erskine Bowles and ahead of Secretary of State Elaine Marshall.<ref>2002 Primary Election Results, US Senate , North Carolina Board of Elections</ref>

He was selected by his local Democratic Party to return to what was essentially his former seat in the North Carolina House of Representatives, after his successor, Bernard Allen, died while running unopposed in the November 2006 election. Democrats also voted to allow Allen's votes in the election to go toward Blue.

Governor Mike Easley, obligated to accept the nomination of the party, appointed Blue to the legislature on November 2, 2006. He served the remaining months of Allen's term and then took his seat for a full term in January 2007.

 Other work 
Blue serves on Duke University's Board of Trustees and was elected chairman in 2009. He was the first African American to chair Duke's board.

After leaving the North Carolina House of Representatives, Blue returned to his private law practice and was hired as a lobbyist for cities on energy issues.

 Personal life 
Blue and his wife, Edna, have three children. His daughter Kanika, is a law professor at Campbell Law School. Kanika is married to Jeff Capel III, a college basketball coach. Blue's son, Dan III, ran for North Carolina State Treasurer in the 2016 elections.

References

External links
North Carolina General Assembly - Senator Dan Blue official NC Senate website
Project Vote Smart - Representative Daniel Terry 'Dan' Blue Jr. (NC) profile
News & Observer profileFollow the Money - Dan Blue
2008 2000 1998 1996 campaign contributions
Daniel T. Blue Jr. Thigpen, Blue, Stephens & Fellers'', attorney profile
The New Republic article

|-

|-

|-

|-

|-

1949 births
20th-century American politicians
21st-century American politicians
20th-century African-American politicians
African-American men in politics
21st-century African-American politicians
African-American state legislators in North Carolina
Living people
North Carolina Central University alumni
North Carolina lawyers
Democratic Party North Carolina state senators
People from Raleigh, North Carolina
People from Lumberton, North Carolina
Speakers of the North Carolina House of Representatives
Democratic Party members of the North Carolina House of Representatives
Duke University School of Law alumni